Mohamed Omer served as the interim foreign minister of Eritrea after the death of Ali Said Abdella in August 2005.  He is currently the Director General of the North Africa and Middle East Desk of the Eritrean Foreign Ministry.

References

Year of birth missing (living people)
Living people
Eritrean diplomats
People's Front for Democracy and Justice politicians
Foreign ministers of Eritrea
Government ministers of Eritrea